Sabuk (also Romanized as Sabūk) is a village in Kuh Mareh Sorkhi Rural District, Arzhan District, Shiraz County, Fars Province, Iran. At the 2006 census, its population was 565, in 112 families.

References 

Populated places in Shiraz County